Tongbai County is a county in the south of Henan province, China, bordering Hubei province to the south.

Administrative divisions
As 2012, this county is divided to 9 towns and 7 townships.
Towns

Townships

Climate

Transport
China National Highway 312

References

County-level divisions of Henan
Nanyang, Henan